Sidney Ercil Smith (born July 6, 1948) is a former American football offensive lineman who played for the Kansas City Chiefs and the Houston Oilers of the National Football League. Smith was drafted by the Chiefs in the first round of the 1970 NFL Draft, the team's first pick since their alignment to the NFL. He is an alumnus of the University of Southern California.

He was assistant head football coach and defensive coordinator of Cornelius Thompson at St. Thomas High School in Houston, Texas.

References

1948 births
Living people
Players of American football from Wichita, Kansas
American football offensive linemen
Wilson Classical High School alumni
USC Trojans football players
Kansas City Chiefs players
Houston Oilers players